Eugen Corrodi (2 July 1922 – 7 September 1975) was a Swiss football goalkeeper who played for Switzerland in the 1950 FIFA World Cup. He also played for FC Lugano.

References

1922 births
Swiss men's footballers
Switzerland international footballers
Association football goalkeepers
FC Lugano players
1950 FIFA World Cup players
1975 deaths